The Super Series were exhibition games between Soviet teams and NHL teams that took place on the NHL opponents' home ice in North America from 1976 to 1991. The Soviet teams were usually club teams from the Soviet hockey league. The exception was in 1983, when the Soviet National Team represented the Soviet Union. A total of 18 series were held; the Soviet teams won 14 and the NHL won 2, with the remaining two series tied. 98 games were played across the 18 series, with Soviet teams posting an overall record of 55–33–10.

Summary of results

Soviet and NHL overall record by series and games

Records between individual Soviet and NHL teams 

 GP: games played between NHL and Soviet Team
 PCT: winning percentage of NHL team versus Soviet Team

Super Series 1976

Moscow Central Red Army versus the NHL 
The Red Army won a series against NHL teams, with 2 wins, 1 tie, 1 loss. The scores
were:
 1975-12-28 Red Army beat New York Rangers 7 to 3
 1975-12-31 Red Army tied Montreal Canadiens 3 to 3
 1976-01-08 Red Army beat Boston Bruins 5 to 2
 1976-01-11 Philadelphia Flyers beat Red Army 4 to 1

Soviet Wings versus the NHL 
The Wings won a series against NHL teams with 3 wins, 0 ties, 1 loss. The scores were:
 1975-12-29 Soviet Wings beat Pittsburgh Penguins 7 to 4
 1976-01-04 Buffalo Sabres beat Soviet Wings 12 to 6
 1976-01-07 Soviet Wings beat Chicago Blackhawks 4 to 2
 1976-01-10 Soviet Wings beat New York Islanders 2 to 1

Super Series 1978

Spartak Moscow versus the NHL 
Spartak won a series against NHL teams with 3 wins, 0 ties, 2 losses. The scores were:
 Vancouver Canucks beat Spartak 2 to 0
 Spartak beat Colorado Rockies 8 to 3
 Spartak beat St. Louis Blues 2 to 1
 Montreal Canadiens beat Spartak 5 to 2
 Spartak beat Atlanta Flames 2 to 1

Super Series 1979

Soviet Wings versus the NHL 
Soviet Wings won a series against NHL teams with 2 wins, 1 tie, 1 loss. The scores were:
 Soviet Wings beat Minnesota North Stars 8 to 5
 Soviet Wings tied Philadelphia Flyers 4 to 4
 Detroit Red Wings beat Soviet Wings 6 to 5
 Soviet Wings beat Boston Bruins 4 to 1

Super Series 1980

Dynamo Moscow versus NHL 
Dynamo Moscow won a series against NHL team with 2 wins, 1 tie, and 1 loss. The scores were:
 Vancouver Canucks beat Dynamo Moscow 6 to 2
 Dynamo Moscow  beat Winnipeg Jets 7 to 0
 Dynamo Moscow beat Edmonton Oilers 4 to 1
 Dynamo Moscow tied Washington Capitals, 5 to 5.

Moscow Central Red Army versus the NHL 
Red Army won a series against NHL teams with 3 wins, 0 ties, and 2 losses. The scores were:
 Red Army beat New York Rangers 5 to 2
 Red Army beat New York Islanders 3 to 2
 Montreal Canadiens beat Red Army 4 to 2
 Buffalo Sabres beat Red Army 6 to 1
 Red Army beat Quebec Nordiques 6 to 4

Super Series 1983 
Soviet journalist Vsevolod Kukushkin reported in his 2016 book The Red Machine, that the nickname for the Soviet national team came into usage during the 1983 series, when a headline in a Minneapolis newspaper read "The Red Machine rolled down on us".

Soviet national team versus NHL 
The USSR won a series against NHL teams with 4 wins, 0 ties, and 2 losses. The scores were:
 Edmonton Oilers beat USSR 4 to 3
 USSR beat Quebec Nordiques 3 to 0
 USSR beat Montreal Canadiens 5 to 0
 Calgary Flames beat USSR 3 to 2
 USSR beat Minnesota North Stars 6 to 3
 USSR beat Philadelphia Flyers 5 to 1

Super Series 1986

Moscow Central Red Army versus the NHL 
Red Army won a series against NHL teams with 5 wins, 0 ties, and 1 loss. The scores were:
 Red Army beat Los Angeles Kings 5 to 2
 Red Army beat Edmonton Oilers 6 to 3
 Quebec Nordiques beat Red Army 5 to 1
 Red Army beat Montreal Canadiens 6 to 1
 Red Army beat St. Louis Blues 4 to 2
 Red Army beat Minnesota North Stars 4 to 3

Dynamo Moscow versus NHL 
Dynamo Moscow won a series against NHL teams with 2 wins, 1 tie, and 1 loss. The scores were:
 Calgary Flames beat Dynamo Moscow 4 to 3 (OT)
 Dynamo Moscow tied Pittsburgh Penguins 3 to 3
 Dynamo Moscow beat Boston Bruins 6 to 4
 Dynamo Moscow beat Buffalo Sabres 7 to 4

Super Series 1989

Moscow Central Red Army versus the NHL 
Red Army won a series against NHL teams with 4 wins, 1 tie, and 2 losses. The scores were:
 Red Army tied the Quebec Nordiques 5 to 5
 Red Army beat the New York Islanders 3 to 2
 Red Army beat the Boston Bruins 5 to 4
 Red Army beat the New Jersey Devils 5 to 0
 Pittsburgh Penguins beat the Red Army 4 to 2
 Red Army beat the Hartford Whalers 6 to 3
 Buffalo Sabres beat the Red Army 6 to 5

Dynamo Riga versus NHL 
The NHL teams won a series against Dynamo Riga with 4 wins, 1 tie, 2 losses. The scores were:
 Dynamo Riga tied the Calgary Flames 2 to 2 (Perry Berezan, Hakan Loob) (Alexander Kerch, Alexander Belyavsky)
 Edmonton Oilers beat Dynamo Riga 2 to 1
 Vancouver Canucks beat Dynamo Riga 6 to 1
 Dynamo Riga beat Los Angeles Kings 5 to 3
 Chicago Blackhawks beat Dynamo Riga 4 to 1
 St. Louis Blues beat Dynamo Riga 5 to 0
 Dynamo Riga beat Minnesota North Stars 2 to 1
 Washington Capitals beat Dynamo Riga 2 to 1 (19 September 1989 in Riga)

Super Series 1990

Khimik Voskresensk versus the NHL 
Khimik Voskresensk tied a series against NHL teams with 3 wins, 0 ties, 3 losses. The scores were:
 Khimik Voskresensk beat Los Angeles Kings 6 to 3
 Edmonton Oilers beat Khimik Voskresensk 6 to 2
 Calgary Flames beat Khimik Voskresensk 6 to 3
 Khimik Voskresensk beat Detroit Red Wings 4 to 2
 Washington Capitals beat Khimik Voskresensk 5 to 2
 Khimik Voskresensk beat St. Louis Blues 6 to 3

Soviet Wings versus the NHL 
The NHL teams won a series against Soviet Wings  with 3 wins, 1 tie, 1 loss. The scores were:
 New York Islanders beat Soviet Wings 5 to 4
 Hartford Whalers beat Soviet Wings 4 to 3
 Soviet Wings tied Quebec Nordiques 4 to 4
 Soviet Wings beat New York Rangers 3 to 1
 Montreal Canadiens beat Soviet Wings 2 to 1

Moscow Central Red Army versus the NHL 
Red Army won a series against NHL teams with 4 wins, 0 ties, 1 loss. The scores were:
 Winnipeg Jets beat Red Army 4 to 1
 Red Army beat Vancouver Canucks 6 to 0
 Red Army beat Minnesota North Stars 4 to 2
 Red Army beat Chicago Blackhawks 6 to 4
 Red Army beat Philadelphia Flyers 5 to 4

Dynamo Moscow versus NHL 
Dynamo Moscow won a series against NHL team, with 3 wins, 0 ties, and 2 losses. The scores were:
 Dynamo Moscow beat Pittsburgh Penguins 5 to 2
 Dynamo Moscow beat Toronto Maple Leafs 7 to 4
 Buffalo Sabres beat Dynamo Moscow 4 to 2
 New Jersey Devils beat Dynamo Moscow 7 to 1
 Dynamo Moscow beat Boston Bruins 3 to 1

Super Series 1991

Khimik Voskresensk versus the NHL 
Khimik Voskresensk tied a series against NHL teams with 3 wins, 1 tie, 3 losses. The scores were:
 Los Angeles Kings beat Khimik Voskresensk 5 to 1
 St. Louis Blues beat Khimik Voskresensk 4 to 2
 Khimik Voskresensk tied New York Islanders 2 to 2
 Khimik Voskresensk beat Montreal Canadiens 6 to 3
 Khimik Voskresensk beat Buffalo Sabres 5 to 4
 Khimik Voskresensk beat Boston Bruins 5 to 2
 Minnesota North Stars beat Khimik Voskresensk 6 to 4

Moscow Central Red Army versus the NHL 
The Red Army won a series against NHL teams with 6 wins, 0 ties, 1 loss. The scores were:
 Red Army beat Detroit Red Wings 5 to 2
 Red Army beat New York Rangers 6 to 1
 Red Army beat Chicago Blackhawks 4 to 2
 Red Army beat Calgary Flames 6 to 4

 Edmonton Oilers beat Red Army 4 to 2

 Red Army beat Winnipeg Jets 6 to 4
 Red Army beat Vancouver Canucks 4 to 3 (OT)

Dynamo Moscow versus NHL 
Dynamo Moscow won a series against NHL teams with 3 wins, 2 ties, 2 losses. The scores were:
 Toronto Maple Leafs beat Dynamo Moscow 7 to 4
 Dynamo Moscow tied Hartford Whalers 0 to 0
 Dynamo Moscow tied New Jersey Devils 2 to 2
 Washington Capitals beat Dynamo Moscow 3 to 2
 Dynamo Moscow beat Philadelphia Flyers 4 to 1 (Yuri Leonov-2, Igor Dorofeyev, Alexandr Galchenyuk)(Rick Tocchet)
 Dynamo Moscow beat Pittsburgh Penguins 4 to 3 (Alexei Zhamnov, Ravil Yakubov, Alexander Semak, Andrei Lomakin)(Errey, Jiri Hrdina, S. Young)
 Dynamo Moscow beat Quebec Nordiques 4 to 1 (Igor Dorofeyev-2, Kovalev, Ravil Khaydarov)(Pearson)

See also
 Super Series '76-77
 Rendez-vous '87
 NHL Challenge
 2007 Super Series
 List of international ice hockey competitions featuring NHL players
 Victoria Cup
 List of KHL vs NHL games
 Aggie Kukulowicz, Canadian-born Russian language interpreter for the series

References

External links
 Super Series '75-76:CSKA and Krylya Sovetov vs NHL clubs
 Canada Versus the Soviet Union

 
National Hockey League All-Star Games
International ice hockey competitions hosted by Canada
International ice hockey competitions hosted by the Soviet Union
International ice hockey competitions hosted by the United States
Ice hockey rivalries
Soviet Union–United States relations
Canada–Soviet Union relations
Recurring sporting events established in 1975
1975 establishments in North America
Recurring sporting events disestablished in 1991
1975 disestablishments in North America